Murex aduncospinosus, also known as the Short-spined murex, is a species of large predatory sea snail, a marine gastropod mollusk in the family Muricidae, the rock snails or murex snails.

References

 Tsi, C. Y. & Ma, S. T. (1982). A preliminary checklist of the marine gastropoda and Bivalvia (Mollusca) of Hong Kong and southern China. In: Proceedings of the first international marine biological workshop: The marine flora and fauna of Hong Kong and southern China (ed. Morton, B.), vol. 1, pp431-458. Hong Kong University Press, Hong Kong
 Drivas, J. & Jay, M. (1987). Coquillages de La Réunion et de l'Île Maurice. Collection Les Beautés de la Nature. Delachaux et Niestlé: Neuchâtel. ISBN 2-603-00654-1. 159 pp. 
 Liu, J.Y. [Ruiyu] (ed.). (2008). Checklist of marine biota of China seas. China Science Press. 1267 pp.

External links
 Sowerby, G. B., I; Sowerby, G. B., II. (1832-1841). The conchological illustrations or, Coloured figures of all the hitherto unfigured recent shells. London, privately published

Gastropods described in 1841
Murex